Jayantha Weerasinghe (born 13 September 1950) is a Sri Lankan lawyer, politician and Member of Parliament.

Weerasinghe was born on 13 September 1950. He was educated at Royal College, Colombo. He has a LLB degree from the University of Colombo. He became a President's Counsel in 2010.

Weerasinghe is Prime Minister Mahinda Rajapaksa's legal advisor. Following the 2020 parliamentary election he was appointed to the Parliament of Sri Lanka as a National List MP representing the Sri Lanka People's Freedom Alliance.

References

1950 births
Alumni of Royal College, Colombo
Alumni of the University of Colombo
Living people
Members of the 16th Parliament of Sri Lanka
President's Counsels (Sri Lanka)
Sinhalese lawyers
Sinhalese politicians
Sri Lankan Buddhists
Sri Lanka People's Freedom Alliance politicians
Sri Lanka Podujana Peramuna politicians